Favio Enrique Álvarez (born 23 January 1993) is an Argentine professional footballer who plays as an attacking midfielder for Argentine Primera División club Talleres de Córdoba, on loan from Liga MX club UNAM.

Career
Álvarez began with Torneo Argentino A team Talleres in 2010, he remained there for five years and made eighty-eight appearances before joining Primera División club Defensa y Justicia in 2015. He made his bow on 14 February against Gimnasia y Esgrima. In January 2016, Álvarez signed for Sarmiento and went onto make nine appearances during the 2016 Primera División season. On 29 August, Álvarez completed a move to Atlético Tucumán. On 7 May 2019, Álvarez joined Major League Soccer side LA Galaxy on loan. His debut came in a loss to Colorado Rapids on 19 May, followed soon by his first goal versus Sporting Kansas City.

Career statistics
.

Honours
Talleres
Torneo Argentino A: 2012–13

References

External links

1993 births
Living people
Footballers from Córdoba, Argentina#
Argentine footballers
Association football midfielders
Argentine expatriate footballers
Torneo Argentino A players
Torneo Federal A players
Primera Nacional players
Argentine Primera División players
Major League Soccer players
Liga MX players
Defensa y Justicia footballers
Club Atlético Sarmiento footballers
Atlético Tucumán footballers
LA Galaxy players
Club Universidad Nacional footballers
Talleres de Córdoba footballers
Argentine expatriate sportspeople in the United States
Argentine expatriate sportspeople in Mexico
Expatriate soccer players in the United States
Expatriate footballers in Mexico